Striatosedulia cattiensis is a species of grasshoppers in the subfamily Catantopinae, found in Vietnam.
 
This species was named after Cát Tiên National Park, which is the type locality and is thought to be endemic to Dong Nai Province.

References

External links 
 

Orthoptera of Indo-China
Acrididae